"She Drove Me to Daytime Television" is a song by Welsh post-hardcore band Funeral for a Friend. It was originally released on the band's EP Four Ways to Scream Your Name. The song also appeared on FFAF's debut LP, Casually Dressed & Deep in Conversation.

"She Drove Me to Daytime TV" was then released as a "double A-side" on the 6 October 2003; its sister release was "Bullet Theory". It reached #20 in the UK Singles Chart.

The promotional video showed the band playing normally with frequent X-ray-like views of the band members as the camera "flies" through them.
Whereas the promotional video for Bullet Theory introduced the faceless characters who are digging in the sand on a beach looking for a chest with a mask/face in it.

Track listing

Bullet Theory Digital Download
"Bullet Theory"
"Interview (Video)"
"Bullet Theory (Video)"

She Drove Me To Daytime Television Pt.1
"She Drove Me To Daytime Television"
"Bullet Theory (Clean version)"
"The System (Far cover) [Live at Radio One Station]"
"She Drove Me To Daytime Television (Video)"

Bullet Theory Pt.2
"Bullet Theory 
"She Drove Me To Daytime Television [BBC Wales Session]" 
"Juneau [BBC Wales Session]" 
"Bullet Theory (Video)"

She Drove Me To Daytime Television/Bullet Theory 7" Vinyl
"She Drove Me To Daytime Television"
"Bullet Theory"

Covers

English band Fightstar covered the song "She Drove Me to Daytime Television", including it as a B-Side on their Hazy Eyes single

Notes

2003 singles
Funeral for a Friend songs
Wikipedia requested audio of songs
2003 songs